Kozhikode Lok Sabha constituency is one of the 20 Lok Sabha (parliamentary) constituencies in the Indian state of Kerala.

Assembly segments 

Kozhikode Lok Sabha constituency is composed of the following assembly segments:

Members of Parliament

Election results

General election 2019

General election 2014

General election 2004

See also
 Indian general election, 2014 (Kerala)
 Kozhikode
 List of Constituencies of the Lok Sabha

References

External links
 Election Commission of India: https://web.archive.org/web/20081218010942/http://www.eci.gov.in/StatisticalReports/ElectionStatistics.asp

Lok Sabha constituencies in Kerala
Politics of Kozhikode district